Sidera lenis is a species of fungus belonging to the family Rickenellaceae.

Synonym:
 Physisporus lenis P.Karst, 1886 (= basionym)

References

Hymenochaetales